Valerus was a bishop of Zaragoza (Spain) in c. 277 AD.

3rd-century bishops in Hispania
People from Zaragoza
Year of birth missing
Year of death missing

Etruscan who overpowers Agis, 'Aeneid Book 10 line 887'